Jon Connolly (born 3 April 1981) is a Scottish football goalkeeper and is currently the goalkeeping coach at Annan Athletic. Connolly has previously played in the Scottish Premier League for Motherwell.

Career
Connolly began his senior career in the Academy system at Ipswich Town but returned to Scotland to sign for Albion Rovers in February 1998, making eight league appearances in the Scottish Football League Third Division before the end of the season. After leaving Rovers, he dropped to Junior level with Thorniewood United before being signed by manager Billy Davies for Motherwell in the summer of 2000.

With Motherwell releasing a number of high-earning first team players including Andy Goram, Connolly found himself as second choice keeper at Fir Park behind Stevie Woods. He made his Scottish Premier League debut in April 2001 against Dundee United at Tannadice and retained his place in the team for the following weeks match against Aberdeen.

These proved to be his only first team appearances for Motherwell and Connolly left the club on the eve of the January 2002 transfer window, signing for Dumbarton until the end of the season. A year at Cumnock Juniors was followed by another Scottish Football League spell with East Stirlingshire in 2003–04 where he made nineteen league appearances.

After leaving Shire, Connolly has enjoyed a peripatetic career in Junior football. In recent years, he joined Kilwinning Rangers in May 2013 before moving on to Kirkintilloch Rob Roy in January 2014. Connolly signed for Vale of Clyde in the summer of 2014 and had short stints at Rossvale and St. Anthony's before joining East Superleague side Fauldhouse United in October 2016.

Connolly was appointed as player-manager of Fauldhouse in February 2017.

References

External links

Living people
1981 births
Scottish footballers
Scottish Premier League players
Scottish Football League players
Scottish Junior Football Association players
Association football goalkeepers
Scottish football managers
Albion Rovers F.C. players
Thorniewood United F.C. players
Stenhousemuir F.C. players
Motherwell F.C. players
Dumbarton F.C. players
Cumnock Juniors F.C. players
East Stirlingshire F.C. players
Linlithgow Rose F.C. players
Larkhall Thistle F.C. players
Bo'ness United F.C. players
Fauldhouse United F.C. players
Cambuslang Rangers F.C. players
St Anthony's F.C. players
Kirkintilloch Rob Roy F.C. players
Dunipace F.C. players
Kilwinning Rangers F.C. players
Vale of Clyde F.C. players
Rossvale F.C. players